The 1st Houston Film Critics Society Awards were announced on January 3, 2008. The awards are presented annually by the Houston Film Critics Society (HFCS) based in Houston, Texas. In addition to the category awards, the HFCS named filmmakers Joel and Ethan Coen as "honorary Texans" for their work on No Country for Old Men.  This is the only year to date that the HFCS has presented an award in the "Best Performance by an Ensemble Cast" category.

Top 10 Films
 No Country for Old Men
 Juno
 Atonement
 Michael Clayton 
 Into the Wild
 Sweeney Todd: The Demon Barber of Fleet Street
 The Diving Bell and the Butterfly (Le scaphandre et le papillon)
 Before the Devil Knows You're Dead
 Charlie Wilson's War  
 I'm Not There

Winners and nominees
Winners are listed first and highlighted with boldface

Notes

References

External links
Houston Film Critics Society: Awards

2007
2007 film awards
2007 in Texas
Houston